Elizabeth Hana Mandlik (born 19 May 2001) is an American tennis player.

Mandlik has career-high rankings by the Women's Tennis Association (WTA) of world No. 119 in singles and world No. 187 in doubles, both achieved on 7 November 2022. She has won seven singles titles and three doubles titles on the ITF Women's Circuit.

Career

2019: WTA debut
Mandlik made her WTA Tour main-draw debut at the 2019 Luxembourg Open in the doubles tournament, partnering Katie Volynets.

2022: First WTA win, top 125 debut
Ranked No. 240, Mandlik qualified for the main draw and earned her first WTA tournament win at the Silicon Valley Classic, defeating Alison Riske-Amritraj in straight sets. In the second round, she took world No. 4 and second seed Paula Badosa to three sets, losing in a final set tiebreaker. As a result, she moved 60 positions into the top 200, at world No. 181 in the rankings.

Mandlik won the US Open Wildcard Challenge to enter the women's singles tournament where she made her major main-draw debut, 33 years after her mother last played in the US Open. Mandlíková became the first US Open women's singles champion in the Open era to have a daughter also play the US Open. Mandlik reached the second round of the US Open, defeating Tamara Zidansek in three sets, in the first round, and losing to eventual finalist Ons Jabeur, in straight sets, in the second.

2023: Australian Open debut
She made her debut at the Australian Open as a lucky loser.

Personal life
Mandlik is the daughter of Grand Slam tennis champion Hana Mandlíková.

Performance timeline
Only main-draw results in WTA Tour, Grand Slam tournaments, Fed Cup/Billie Jean King Cup and Olympic Games are included in win–loss records.

Singles
Current through the 2023 ATX Open.

Doubles

WTA Challenger finals

Doubles: 1 (runner-up)

ITF Circuit finals

Singles: 9 (7 titles, 2 runner–ups)

Doubles: 4 (3 titles, 1 runner-up)

Notes

References

External links
 
 

2001 births
Living people
American female tennis players
Sportspeople from Boca Raton, Florida
American people of Czech descent
Tennis people from Florida
21st-century American women